Osmium (76Os) has seven naturally occurring isotopes, five of which are stable: 187Os, 188Os, 189Os, 190Os, and (most abundant) 192Os. The other natural isotopes, 184Os, and 186Os, have extremely long half-life (1.12×1013 years and 2×1015 years, respectively) and for practical purposes can be considered to be stable as well. 187Os is the daughter of 187Re (half-life 4.56×1010 years) and is most often measured in an 187Os/188Os ratio. This ratio, as well as the 187Re/188Os ratio, have been used extensively in dating terrestrial as well as meteoric rocks. It has also been used to measure the intensity of continental weathering over geologic time and to fix minimum ages for stabilization of the mantle roots of continental cratons. However, the most notable application of Os in dating has been in conjunction with iridium, to analyze the layer of shocked quartz along the Cretaceous–Paleogene boundary that marks the extinction of the dinosaurs 66 million years ago.

There are also 30 artificial radioisotopes, the longest-lived of which is 194Os with a half-life of six years; all others have half-lives under 94 days. There are also nine known nuclear isomers, the longest-lived of which is 191mOs with a half-life of 13.10 hours. All isotopes and nuclear isomers of osmium are either radioactive or observationally stable, meaning that they are predicted to be radioactive but no actual decay has been observed.

Uses of osmium isotopes 
The isotopic ratio of osmium-187 and osmium-188 (187Os/188Os) can be used as a window into geochemical changes throughout the ocean's history. The average marine 187Os/188Os ratio in oceans is 1.06. This value represents a balance of the continental derived riverine inputs of Os with a 187Os/188Os ratio of ~1.3, and the mantle/extraterrestrial inputs with a 187Os/188Os ratio of ~0.13. Being a descendent of 187Re, 187Os can be radiogenically formed by beta decay. This decay has actually pushed the 187Os/188Os ratio of the Bulk silicate earth (Earth minus the core) by 33%. This is what drives the difference in the 187Os/188Os ratio we see between continental materials and mantle material. Crustal rocks have a much higher level of Re, which slowly degrades into 187Os driving up the ratio. Within the mantle however, the uneven response of Re and Os results in these mantle, and melted materials being depleted in Re, and do not allow for them to accumulate 187Os like the continental material. The input of both materials in the marine environment results in the observed 187Os/188Os of the oceans and has fluctuated greatly over the history of our planet. These changes in the isotopic values of marine Os can be observed in the marine sediment that is deposited, and eventually lithified in that time period. This allows for researchers to make estimates on weathering fluxes, identifying flood basalt volcanism, and impact events that may have caused some of our largest mass extinctions. The marine sediment Os isotope record has been used to identify and corroborate the impact of the K-T boundary for example. The impact of this ~10 km asteroid massively altered the 187Os/188Os signature of marine sediments at that time. With the average extraterrestrial 187Os/188Os of ~0.13 and the huge amount of Os this impact contributed (equivalent to 600,000 years of present-day riverine inputs) lowered the global marine 187Os/188Os value of ~0.45 to ~0.2.

Os isotope ratios may also be used as a signal of anthropogenic impact. The same 187Os/188Os ratios that are common in geological settings may be used to gauge the addition of anthropogenic Os through things like catalytic converters. While catalytic converters have been shown to drastically reduce the emission of NOx and CO2, they are introducing platinum group elements (PGE) such as Os, to the environment. Other sources of anthropogenic Os include combustion of fossil fuels, smelting chromium ore, and smelting of some sulfide ores. In one study, the effect of automobile exhaust on the marine Os system was evaluated. Automobile exhaust 187Os/188Os has been recorded to be ~0.2 (similar to extraterrestrial and mantle derived inputs) which is heavily depleted (3, 7). The effect of anthropogenic Os can be seen best by comparing aquatic Os ratios and local sediments or deeper waters. Impacted surface waters tend to have depleted values compared to deep ocean and sediments beyond the limit of what is expected from cosmic inputs. This increase in effect is thought to be due to the introduction of anthropogenic airborne Os into precipitation.

The long half-life of 184Os with respect to alpha decay to 180W has been proposed as a radiometric dating method for osmium-rich rocks or for differentiation of a planetary core.

List of isotopes 

|-
| 161Os
| style="text-align:right" | 76
| style="text-align:right" | 85
| 
| 0.64(6) ms
| α
| 157W
|
| 
|
|-
| 162Os
| style="text-align:right" | 76
| style="text-align:right" | 86
| 161.98443(54)#
| 1.87(18) ms
| α
| 158W
| 0+
|
|
|-
| rowspan=3|163Os
| rowspan=3 style="text-align:right" | 76
| rowspan=3 style="text-align:right" | 87
| rowspan=3|162.98269(43)#
| rowspan=3|5.5(6) ms
| α
| 159W
| rowspan=3|7/2−#
| rowspan=3|
| rowspan=3|
|-
| β+, p (rare)
| 162W
|-
| β+ (rare)
| 163Re
|-
| rowspan=2|164Os
| rowspan=2 style="text-align:right" | 76
| rowspan=2 style="text-align:right" | 88
| rowspan=2|163.97804(22)
| rowspan=2|21(1) ms
| α (98%)
| 160W
| rowspan=2|0+
| rowspan=2|
| rowspan=2|
|-
| β+ (2%)
| 164Re
|-
| rowspan=2|165Os
| rowspan=2 style="text-align:right" | 76
| rowspan=2 style="text-align:right" | 89
| rowspan=2|164.97676(22)#
| rowspan=2|71(3) ms
| α (60%)
| 161W
| rowspan=2|(7/2−)
| rowspan=2|
| rowspan=2|
|-
| β+ (40%)
| 165Re
|-
| rowspan=2|166Os
| rowspan=2 style="text-align:right" | 76
| rowspan=2 style="text-align:right" | 90
| rowspan=2|165.972691(20)
| rowspan=2|216(9) ms
| α (72%)
| 162W
| rowspan=2|0+
| rowspan=2|
| rowspan=2|
|-
| β+ (28%)
| 166Re
|-
| rowspan=2|167Os
| rowspan=2 style="text-align:right" | 76
| rowspan=2 style="text-align:right" | 91
| rowspan=2|166.97155(8)
| rowspan=2|810(60) ms
| α (67%)
| 163W
| rowspan=2|3/2−#
| rowspan=2|
| rowspan=2|
|-
| β+ (33%)
| 167Re
|-
| rowspan=2|168Os
| rowspan=2 style="text-align:right" | 76
| rowspan=2 style="text-align:right" | 92
| rowspan=2|167.967804(13)
| rowspan=2|2.06(6) s
| β+ (51%)
| 168Re
| rowspan=2|0+
| rowspan=2|
| rowspan=2|
|-
| α (49%)
| 164W
|-
| rowspan=2|169Os
| rowspan=2 style="text-align:right" | 76
| rowspan=2 style="text-align:right" | 93
| rowspan=2|168.967019(27)
| rowspan=2|3.40(9) s
| β+ (89%)
| 169Re
| rowspan=2|3/2−#
| rowspan=2|
| rowspan=2|
|-
| α (11%)
| 165W
|-
| rowspan=2|170Os
| rowspan=2 style="text-align:right" | 76
| rowspan=2 style="text-align:right" | 94
| rowspan=2|169.963577(12)
| rowspan=2|7.46(23) s
| β+ (91.4%)
| 170Re
| rowspan=2|0+
| rowspan=2|
| rowspan=2|
|-
| α (8.6%)
| 166W
|-
| rowspan=2|171Os
| rowspan=2 style="text-align:right" | 76
| rowspan=2 style="text-align:right" | 95
| rowspan=2|170.963185(20)
| rowspan=2|8.3(2) s
| β+ (98.3%)
| 171Re
| rowspan=2|(5/2−)
| rowspan=2|
| rowspan=2|
|-
| α (1.7%)
| 167W
|-
| rowspan=2|172Os
| rowspan=2 style="text-align:right" | 76
| rowspan=2 style="text-align:right" | 96
| rowspan=2|171.960023(16)
| rowspan=2|19.2(5) s
| β+ (98.9%)
| 172Re
| rowspan=2|0+
| rowspan=2|
| rowspan=2|
|-
| α (1.1%)
| 168W
|-
| rowspan=2|173Os
| rowspan=2 style="text-align:right" | 76
| rowspan=2 style="text-align:right" | 97
| rowspan=2|172.959808(16)
| rowspan=2|22.4(9) s
| β+ (99.6%)
| 173Re
| rowspan=2|(5/2−)
| rowspan=2|
| rowspan=2|
|-
| α (.4%)
| 169W
|-
| rowspan=2|174Os
| rowspan=2 style="text-align:right" | 76
| rowspan=2 style="text-align:right" | 98
| rowspan=2|173.957062(12)
| rowspan=2|44(4) s
| β+ (99.97%)
| 174Re
| rowspan=2|0+
| rowspan=2|
| rowspan=2|
|-
| α (.024%)
| 170W
|-
| 175Os
| style="text-align:right" | 76
| style="text-align:right" | 99
| 174.956946(15)
| 1.4(1) min
| β+
| 175Re
| (5/2−)
|
|
|-
| 176Os
| style="text-align:right" | 76
| style="text-align:right" | 100
| 175.95481(3)
| 3.6(5) min
| β+
| 176Re
| 0+
|
|
|-
| 177Os
| style="text-align:right" | 76
| style="text-align:right" | 101
| 176.954965(17)
| 3.0(2) min
| β+
| 177Re
| 1/2−
|
|
|-
| 178Os
| style="text-align:right" | 76
| style="text-align:right" | 102
| 177.953251(18)
| 5.0(4) min
| β+
| 178Re
| 0+
|
|
|-
| 179Os
| style="text-align:right" | 76
| style="text-align:right" | 103
| 178.953816(19)
| 6.5(3) min
| β+
| 179Re
| (1/2−)
|
|
|-
| 180Os
| style="text-align:right" | 76
| style="text-align:right" | 104
| 179.952379(22)
| 21.5(4) min
| β+
| 180Re
| 0+
|
|
|-
| 181Os
| style="text-align:right" | 76
| style="text-align:right" | 105
| 180.95324(3)
| 105(3) min
| β+
| 181Re
| 1/2−
|
|
|-
| style="text-indent:1em" | 181m1Os
| colspan="3" style="text-indent:2em" | 48.9(2) keV
| 2.7(1) min
| β+
| 181Re
| (7/2)−
|
|
|-
| style="text-indent:1em" | 181m2Os
| colspan="3" style="text-indent:2em" | 156.5(7) keV
| 316(18) ns 
|
|
| (9/2)+
|
|
|-
| 182Os
| style="text-align:right" | 76
| style="text-align:right" | 106
| 181.952110(23)
| 22.10(25) h
| EC
| 182Re
| 0+
|
|
|-
| 183Os
| style="text-align:right" | 76
| style="text-align:right" | 107
| 182.95313(5)
| 13.0(5) h
| β+
| 183Re
| 9/2+
|
|
|-
| rowspan=2 style="text-indent:1em" | 183mOs
| rowspan=2 colspan="3" style="text-indent:2em" | 170.71(5) keV
| rowspan=2|9.9(3) h
| β+ (85%)
| 183Re
| rowspan=2|1/2−
| rowspan=2|
| rowspan=2|
|-
| IT (15%)
| 183Os
|-
| 184Os
| style="text-align:right" | 76
| style="text-align:right" | 108
| 183.9524891(14)
| 1.12(23)×1013 y
| α
|180W
| 0+
| 2(1)×10−4
|
|-
| 185Os
| style="text-align:right" | 76
| style="text-align:right" | 109
| 184.9540423(14)
| 93.6(5) d
| EC
| 185Re
| 1/2−
|
|
|-
| style="text-indent:1em" | 185m1Os
| colspan="3" style="text-indent:2em" | 102.3(7) keV
| 3.0(4) μs
|
|
| (7/2−)#
|
|
|-
| style="text-indent:1em" | 185m2Os
| colspan="3" style="text-indent:2em" | 275.7(8) keV
| 0.78(5) μs
|
|
| (11/2+)
|
|
|-
| 186Os
| style="text-align:right" | 76
| style="text-align:right" | 110
| 185.9538382(15)
| 2.0(11)×1015 y
| α
| 182W
| 0+
| 0.0159(3)
|
|-
| 187Os
| style="text-align:right" | 76
| style="text-align:right" | 111
| 186.9557505(15)
| colspan=3 align=center|Observationally Stable
| 1/2−
| 0.0196(2)
|
|-
| 188Os
| style="text-align:right" | 76
| style="text-align:right" | 112
| 187.9558382(15)
| colspan=3 align=center|Observationally Stable<ref group="n">Believed to undergo α decay to 184W</ref>
| 0+
| 0.1324(8)
|
|-
| 189Os
| style="text-align:right" | 76
| style="text-align:right" | 113
| 188.9581475(16)
| colspan=3 align=center|Observationally Stable
| 3/2−
| 0.1615(5)
|
|-
| style="text-indent:1em" | 189mOs
| colspan="3" style="text-indent:2em" | 30.812(15) keV
| 5.81(6) h
| IT
| 189Os
| 9/2−
|
|
|-
| 190Os
| style="text-align:right" | 76
| style="text-align:right" | 114
| 189.9584470(16)
| colspan=3 align=center|Observationally Stable
| 0+
| 0.2626(2)
|
|-
| style="text-indent:1em" | 190mOs
| colspan="3" style="text-indent:2em" | 1705.4(2) keV
| 9.9(1) min
| IT
| 190Os
| (10)−
|
|
|-
| 191Os
| style="text-align:right" | 76
| style="text-align:right" | 115
| 190.9609297(16)
| 15.4(1) d
| β−
| 191Ir
| 9/2−
|
|
|-
| style="text-indent:1em" | 191mOs
| colspan="3" style="text-indent:2em" | 74.382(3) keV
| 13.10(5) h
| IT
| 191Os
| 3/2−
|
|
|-
| 192Os
| style="text-align:right" | 76
| style="text-align:right" | 116
| 191.9614807(27)
| colspan=3 align=center|Observationally Stable
| 0+
| 0.4078(19)
|
|-
| rowspan=2 style="text-indent:1em" | 192mOs
| rowspan=2 colspan="3" style="text-indent:2em" | 2015.40(11) keV
| rowspan=2|5.9(1) s
| IT (87%)
| 192Os
| rowspan=2|(10−)
| rowspan=2|
| rowspan=2|
|-
| β− (13%)
| 192Ir
|-
| 193Os
| style="text-align:right" | 76
| style="text-align:right" | 117
| 192.9641516(27)
| 30.11(1) h
| β−
| 193Ir
| 3/2−
|
|
|-
| 194Os
| style="text-align:right" | 76
| style="text-align:right" | 118
| 193.9651821(28)
| 6.0(2) y
| β−
| 194Ir
| 0+
|
|
|-
| 195Os
| style="text-align:right" | 76
| style="text-align:right" | 119
| 194.96813(54)
| 6.5 min
| β−
| 195Ir
| 3/2−#
|
|
|-
| 196Os
| style="text-align:right" | 76
| style="text-align:right" | 120
| 195.96964(4)
| 34.9(2) min
| β−
| 196Ir
| 0+
|
|
|-
| 197Os
| style="text-align:right" | 76
| style="text-align:right" | 121
|
| 2.8(6) min
|
|
|
|
|

References 

 Isotope masses from:

 Isotopic compositions and standard atomic masses from:

 Half-life, spin, and isomer data selected from the following sources.

 
Osmium
Osmium